Seminar is a play by Theresa Rebeck which premiered on Broadway in 2011.

Productions
Seminar premiered on Broadway at the John Golden Theatre on November 20, 2011 and closed on May 6, 2012. Alan Rickman originated the role of the lead character, Leonard. Jeff Goldblum replaced Rickman as Leonard on April 3, 2012. Ticket sales dropped  following Rickman's departure.

The production was directed by Sam Gold and produced by Jeffrey Finn, Jill Furman, John N. Hart Jr. and Patrick Milling-Smith. It featured original music by John Gromada. This production 
was nominated as Best Play by the Outer Critics Circle and the Drama League, but did not earn any Tony Award nominations.

Seminar opened at the San Francisco Playhouse on May 3, 2014, and received outstanding reviews from the local press. The play was directed by Amy Glazer; the role of Leonard was played by Charles Shaw Robinson.

Plot
Set in present-day New York City, Seminar follows four young writers — Kate, Martin, Douglas, and Izzy — and their professor, Leonard. Each student has paid Leonard $5,000 for a ten-week writing seminar to be held in Kate's Upper West Side apartment. As tensions arise and romance falls, they clash over their writing, their relations, and their futures.

Principal roles and Broadway casts

Critical reception
The play was mostly well received. Ben Brantley of The New York Times criticized some script elements, but praised Rickman's acting: "This mélange of feelings, magnificently orchestrated by Mr. Rickman, is arrived at after Leonard has only glanced at the first couple of pages of a vast manuscript. But ... I felt an authentic rush of pleasure and the exhilaration of being reminded that in theater, art comes less from landing lines than [from] finding what lies between them."

Elysa Gardner of USA Today called Seminar an "enriching study". David Rooney of the Hollywood Reporter found the play "tight, witty and consistently entertaining, acquiring more muscle as the layers are peeled back to reveal both the scarred humanity and the numbness beneath Leonard’s soured exterior."

References

External links
 Official Website
 
 Entry on Playbill.com

2011 plays
Broadway plays
Plays set in New York City
Plays by Theresa Rebeck